Loimia is a genus of annelids belonging to the family Terebellidae.

The genus has cosmopolitan distribution.

Species:

Loimia annulifilis 
Loimia arborea 
Loimia armata 
Loimia bandera 
Loimia batilla 
Loimia bermudensis 
Loimia borealis 
Loimia brasiliensis 
Loimia contorta 
Loimia crassifilis 
Loimia decora 
Loimia grubei 
Loimia ingens 
Loimia juani 
Loimia keablei 
Loimia macrobranchia 
Loimia medusa 
Loimia megaoculata 
Loimia minuta 
Loimia montagui 
Loimia nigrifilis 
Loimia ochracea 
Loimia pseudotriloba 
Loimia ramzega 
Loimia salazari 
Loimia savignyi 
Loimia triloba 
Loimia tuberculata 
Loimia turgida 
Loimia variegata 
Loimia verrucosa 
Loimia viridis

References

Annelids